Suraj Jagan (born 11 May 1967) is an Indian playback singer. He is noted for the song Give Me Some Sunshine from the award-winning movie 3 Idiots. The song received the "Best Emerging Male Performer" award in the Max Stardust Award. Jagan's singing career began in 1990, and has included both solo work and as front man for the rock band Dream Out Loud. He has also worked in advertising jingle campaigns, Bollywood playback singing, acting in theatre productions and an acting role in the Bollywood film Rock On!! & "Hunterrr".

Television and film work
Suraj Jagan began his career working in ad jingles, including the jingle You and I in this beautiful world for the award-winning "Hutch TVC" ad, before making his Bollywood debut with the song Hum Naujawan Hai from the movie Pyaar Mein Kabhi Kabhi in 1997. The song was given to him by fellow rock vocalist Vishal Dadlani, who was one of the music directors of the film.

From 2007 onwards his Bollywood playback songs included "Hey Jhonny" from Johnny Gaddaar, Dum Lagaa from Dil Dosti Etc and "No Big Deal" from Money Hai Toh Honey Hai. He has also sung the song Zehreelay from the movie Rock On!! where he actually performed the song in the movie. He played a part in composing the song and starred in a short cameo in the film with the role of 'Ajay'. The blog Aspi's Drift claimed at the time that Zehreelay was the first Death Metal song used in a Hindi film.

In 2009 he recorded the song "Give Me Some Sunshine" for the film 3 Idiots. The film's music director Shantanu Moitra composed the song with Suraj Jagan's voice in mind, and stated that if the movie's producers did not like Suraj Jagan's voice with the original composition, he would change the tune but would not compromise Suraj Jagan as the singer of the song. Jagan said that "I’ll always be grateful to him for that." Jagan did a guest appearance in the show The Suite Life of Karan & Kabir as Uncle Jojo.

His later playback singing work included Rang De from My Name Is Khan, Dil Dil Hai from 7 Khoon Maaf and Baby when you talk to me from Patiala House. His song Sadka Kiya with Mahalaxmi Iyer from the movie I Hate Luv Storys reached number one in the Indian music charts. He has said that it is his favourite song in Bollywood so far.

Bollywood track list

 Hope Aur Hum (2018) : "Hope Aur Hum"
 Aag Hun Main (2016) : "Kabali"  (METAL)
 Deewaren (2016) : "Deewaren: Unity Song by The Moody Nation"
 Ishq-E-Fillum (2015) : "Shamitabh"
 Kar Ja Re Ya Mar Ja Re Tu (2013) ABCD: Any Body Can Dance
 Ganapati Bapa Mauriya (2013) Iddarammayilatho (Telugu Film)
 Tu hi tu (2012): Oh My God 
Man Hai Bheega (Black Home) Hindi Movie 2012 lyrics-Sahil Sultanpuri / Music-Akshay Hariharan
 Vishwaroopam (2012): Vishwaroopam (Tamil Film)
 Pyaar ka Bukhar (2012): Challenge 2 (Bengali Film)
 Challenge nibi na sala (2012): Challenge 2 (Bengali Film)
 Pudikale Maamu (2012) : Neethaane En Ponvasantham (Tamil film)
 Pankhida (2012) : Kevi Rite Jaish (Gujarati film)
 Aafaton ke Parinde (2012) : Ishaqzaade
 Dil Dhadkane do (2011) : Zindagi Na Milegi Dobara
 Jaa Chudail (2011) : Delhi Belly
 Chhoo Lee (2011) : Mujhse Fraaandship Karoge
 Fareeda (2011) : Shaitan
 Karma Is A Bitch (2011) : Shor in the City
 Akkad Bakkad (2011) : Bhindi Baazaar Inc.
 Koi Aa Raha Hai Paas Hai (2011) : Pyaar Ka Punchnama
 Dil Dil Hai (2011) : 7 Khoon Maaf
 Baby when you talk to me (2011) : Patiala House
 Will You Marry Me (2010 ): Turning 30
 I am Doggone crazy (2010) : Action Replayy
 Rang Daalein (2010) : Lafangey Parindey
 Sadka Kiya (2010) : I Hate Luv Storys
 Dil Khol Ke .. (2010) : We Are Family
 Tum bhi ho wahi (2010) : Kites
 Karthik calling Karthik – Theme Song (2010) : Karthik Calling Karthik
 Rang de (2010) : My Name Is Khan
 Maula (2010) : Hide & Seek
 Hide & Seek (2010) : Hide & Seek
 Give Me Some Sunshine (2009) : 3 Idiots
 Dil Kare (2009) : All the Best: Fun Begins
 Chatle Chalo (2009) : Toss
 Saanson Ka Rukna (2009) : Straight
 Humse Jo Churaiye Humko Hee (2009) : Straight
 Kya Hua Hoo Hoo (2009) : Straight
 Love Love Love (2009) : Straight
 Run Run Run (2009) : Straight
 Sooni Raah Pe] (2009) : The Stoneman murders
 Zehereelay (2008) : Rock On!! (METAL) 
 Theme Song Hijack (2008) : Hijack
 Missing Sunday (2008) : Sunday
 I am a bad boy (2008) : Bhram
 Yeh Faasle (remix) (2008) : Rama Rama Kya Hai Dramaaa
 No Big Deal (2008) : Money Hai Toh Honey Hai
 Zindagi (2007 – yet to be released) : Brides Wanted
 Hey Johnny (2007) : Johnny Gaddaar
 Dum Lagaa] (2007) : Dil Dosti Etc
 Hum Naujawan Hai (1999) : Pyaar Mein Kabhi Kabhi

Tollywood track list
 Hare Hare Rama (2009): Maska
 Ganapathi Bappa (2013): Iddarammayilatho
 Nachaledu Maava Pichi Pichi College (2012):  Yeto Vellipoyindhi Manasu
 Ko Antey Koti (2012):  Ko Antey Koti

Cover Track
 Pehla Nasha: (pop)
 Churaliya hai Tumne : (pop)
 Mere Sapano ki Raani : (pop)
 Rang Barse : (Rock)
 Dum Maro Dum : (Rock)
 Gajab ka hai Din : (Hard Rock)
 Yahoo Chahe Koi Mujhe Junglee : (Hard Rock)
 Rafta Rafta Dekho Aankh meri Ladi hai : (Hard Rock)
 Aaja Aaja Mein hu Pyar Tera : (Metal)

Bands
 2011 : Back To My Future
 2007 – 2009 : Dream out Loud (DOL )
 2006 : The Orchid Room Experiment
 2003 : AFS
 1997 – 1999 : Spyrals
 1995 – 1997 : Chakraview
 1993 – 1995 : Matchbox (HongKong )
 1989 – 1993 : Krysys

Ad jingles

 You and I in this beautiful world
 Happy to help
 Triumph India
 Clovemint
 HDFC (Moon Series )
 Close Up
 Addiction Deo
 Alto
 Onida
 Kinley
 Indiabulls
 Crizal
 Indian Overseas Bank

Live performances

Suraj Jagan performs as a solo artist and is backed up by four rock musicians. Performances include:
 "coloseum-2016" GB Pant University, Pantnagar, 10 April 2016
 "Kolaahal" Meerut Institute of Engineering & Technology (M.I.E.T), Meerut 20 February 2016.
 "Echoes-2013" at Indian Institute of Management, Kozhikode
 MNNIT – Allahabad, UP, India (Culrav – 2013)
 Tata Steel – Jamshedpur
 Mcleod & Russell – Assam
 Horizon - Rait Navi Mumbai (2012)
 SP College – Mumbai
 Delhi College of Engineering – New Delhi
 Griet – Hyderabad
 Srcem – Lucknow
 Ultratech Cement – Hyderabad
 Mood Indigo (IIT – Mumbai with Amit Trivedi )
 Microsoft – Goa
 Chandigarh Carnival
 Lovely Professional College – Jalandhar
 Bollywood Rock at Sutra – Bangalore
 Axis Awards – Mumbai
 Bosch Awards – Jaipur
 IIT Roorkee – Saharanpur Campus
 Heritage College – Kolkata
 Calcutta Medical College
 Umang (Narsee Monjee College of Commerce and Economics, Mumbai)
 Faculty of Technology and Engineering (MS University)-Vadodara
 IIT Bombay, Institute Cultural Night – Mumbai
 IIM Indore (Indian Institute of Management) 2011
 Jalpaiguri Govt. Engineering College, Jalpaiguri
 "Festember '12" National Institute Of Technology Tiruchirappalli, Tamil Nadu
 Arcidia'12 – Academy Of Technology, Adisaptagram, Kolkata
 Encore'12- Institute of Engineering & Technology (IET), Lucknow
 Ragam'12-National Institute Of Technology, Calicut, Kerala
 Horizons 2012-Ramrao Adik Institute of Technology (Navi Mumbai)
 Colosseum 12-Govind Ballabh Pant Of Agriculture And Technology, Pantnagar, Uttrakhand
 Siliguri Institute Of Technology 19 February 2012
 Sikkim Manipal Institute of Technology (Kaalrav'12)- 26 February 2012
 Orissa Engineering College, Bhubaneswar (Zephyr'12)-  20 May 2012
 Bhawani college of Technology, Rourkela (Mashian, 12)- 15 August 2012
 National Institute of Technology, Durgapur (Recstacy'13)- 31/01/20130
 [SANGAMAM] MVSR engineering college Hyderabad-[22-02-12]
 Pyrokinesis: 24-Feb-2013, Assam Engineering College, Guwahati
 Impulse'13' : 14 March 2013, Muslim Association College of Engineering, Trivandrum, Kerala
 Karvaan 13' : 6 April 2013, School of Law, KIIT University, Bhubaneswar, Odisha
 JavaOne 13' : 8 May 2013, HICC, Hyderabad, Andhra Pradesh.
 Spring Spree'14 : NIT Warangal, Andhra Pradesh. 22 February 2014
 Refreshko 14' : 18 September 2014, Supreme Knowledge Foundation Group of Institutions, Hooghly, West Bengal.
 SYMPHONY 2014: Janki Devi Memorial College, University of Delhi

References

External links

 

Living people
Bollywood playback singers
1967 births